The 49ers–Cardinals rivalry is a professional American football rivalry in the National Football League (NFL) between the San Francisco 49ers and the Arizona Cardinals. The two teams met each other occasionally from 1951 to 2000. As part of the league's 2002 realignment, the Cardinals moved from the NFC East to the NFC West Division, of which the 49ers had been a part of since its inception as the Coastal Division in 1967. Since 2002, the teams have competed against each other as division rivals. The rivalry is a closely contested series, particularly after the 2002 realignment. Through the end of the 2022 season, the 49ers lead the series 34–29.

History
The 49ers and Cardinals first met on November 18, 1951 at the former's home field, Kezar Stadium. Behind the performance of Charley Trippi, the then-Chicago Cardinals won the game 27–21. The Cardinals would lead the series prior to the arrival of Bill Walsh, Joe Montana, and Jerry Rice to the 49ers.

Following the 1987 season, the Cardinals relocated to Phoenix, Arizona. In the 49ers' first trip to Phoenix, they blundered a 23–0 lead. The Cardinals came back and won 24–23, scoring a touchdown in the final seconds of the game.

During a 1999 game between the two teams, Cardinals cornerback Aeneas Williams delivered a sack on 49ers quarterback Steve Young. Young was concussed on the play, with his injury ultimately being a career-ending one.

The two teams became division rivals when the Cardinals moved to the NFC West, as part of the NFL's 2002 realignment. In 2004, the 49ers finished with a dismal 2–14 record; both of their 2 wins, however, came against the Cardinals. The following season, the two teams played the first NFL regular season game held outside of the United States. Dubbed "Fútbol Americano", the game was played at Estadio Azteca, in Mexico City; the Cardinals won 31–14.

To kick off their 2006 season, the Cardinals hosted the 49ers at the newly opened University of Phoenix Stadium. The Cardinals won the game 34–27.

During the late 2000s and early 2010s, the 49ers and Cardinals were common Monday Night Football (MNF) opponents, having played each other five times in six years (from 2007 to 2012). In the 2007 matchup, quarterback Alex Smith led the 49ers to a comeback victory over the Cardinals to kickoff the season. Also during this period, Cardinals and 49ers players were noted as often sharing hateful sentiments about the opposing side. 49ers tight end Vernon Davis and Cardinals defensive tackle Darnell Dockett were also noted exchanging barbs on Twitter. The results between the two teams were lopsided during this period, with the Cardinals winning one of ten matchups from 2009 to 2013. Then-Cardinals head coach Bruce Arians likened the rivalry to the Browns–Steelers rivalry. However, shifting into the mid-2010s, the Cardinals dominated the 49ers, winning eight straight games in the rivalry from 2015 to 2018.

The two teams once again met in Mexico for another Monday Night Football matchup in 2022. 49ers quarterback Jimmy Garoppolo passed for 4 touchdowns in the game, leading his team to a 38–10 victory.

Results

|-
| 
| style="| Cardinals  27–21
| Kezar Stadium (San Francisco)
| Cardinals  1–0
| Cardinals located in Chicago from 1922–1943 and 1945–1959.
|-
| 
| style="| Cardinals  20–10
| Kezar Stadium (San Francisco)
| Cardinals  2–0
| 
|-

|-
| 
| style="| 49ers  24–17
| Busch Stadium (St. Louis)
| Cardinals  2–1
| Cardinals relocated from Chicago to St. Louis in 1960. Teams never faced each other in Chicago.
|-
| 
| style="| Cardinals  23–13
| Kezar Stadium (San Francisco)
| Cardinals  3–1
| 
|-
| 
| style="| 49ers  35–17
| Kezar Stadium (San Francisco)
| Cardinals  3–2
| 
|-

|-
| 
| style="| 49ers  26–14
| Busch Memorial Stadium (St. Louis)
| Tied  3–3
| 
|-
| 
| style="| Cardinals  34–9
| Candlestick Park (San Francisco)
| Cardinals  4–3
| 
|-
| 
| style="| Cardinals  23–20 (OT)
| Busch Memorial Stadium (St. Louis)
| Cardinals  5–3
| 
|-
| 
| style="| Cardinals  16–10
| Candlestick Park (San Francisco)
| Cardinals  6–3
| 
|-
| 
| style="| Cardinals  13–10
| Busch Memorial Stadium (St. Louis)
| Cardinals  7–3
| 
|-

|-
| 
| style="| 49ers  24–21 (OT)
| Candlestick Park (San Francisco)
| Cardinals  7–4
|
|-
| 
| style="| 49ers  31–20
| Busch Memorial Stadium (St. Louis)
| Cardinals  7–5
|
|-
| 
| style="| 49ers  42–27
| Busch Memorial Stadium (St. Louis)
| Cardinals  7–6
|
|-
| 
| style="| 49ers  43–17 
| Candlestick Park (San Francisco)
| Tied  7–7
|
|-
| 
| style="| 49ers  34–28
| Candlestick Park (San Francisco)
| 49ers  8–7
|
|-
| 
| style="| Cardinals  24–23
| Sun Devil Stadium (Tempe)
| Tied  8–8
| Cardinals relocated to Phoenix, Arizona. Cardinals overcome 23–0 deficit. 49ers win Super Bowl XXIII.
|-

|-
| 
| style="| 49ers  14–10
| Candlestick Park (San Francisco)
| 49ers  9–8
|
|-
| 
| style="| Cardinals  24–14
| Sun Devil Stadium (Tempe)
| Tied  9–9
|
|-
| 
| style="| 49ers  28–14
| Candlestick Park (San Francisco)
| 49ers  10–9
|
|-
| 
| style="| 49ers  24–10
| Sun Devil Stadium (Tempe)
| 49ers  11–9
| Steve Young's final game.
|-

|-
| 
| style="| 
|
| style="| 49ers  27–20
| 49ers  12–9
|
|-
| 
| style="| 
| style="| 49ers  17–14
| style="| 49ers  38–28
| 49ers  14–9
| Cardinals move to the NFC West as a result of NFL realignment.
|-
| 
| Tie 1–1
| style="| Cardinals  16–13 (OT)
| style="| 49ers  50–14
| 49ers  15–10
|
|-
| 
| style="| 
| style="| 49ers  31–28 (OT)
| style="| 49ers  31–28 (OT)
| 49ers  17–10
| 49ers' lone regular season wins in 2004.
|-
| 
| style="| 
| style="| Cardinals  31–14
| style="| Cardinals  17–10
| 49ers  17–12
| Cardinals home game was first regular season game played outside the United States, in Mexico City at Estadio Azteca on Monday Night Football, marketed as Fútbol Americano.
|-
| 
| style="| 
| style="| Cardinals  34–27
| style="| Cardinals  26–20
| 49ers  17–14 
| Cardinals open University of Phoenix Stadium.
|-
| 
| style="| 
| style="| 49ers  37–31 (OT)
| style="| 49ers  20–17
| 49ers  19–14
|
|-
| 
| style="| 
| style="| Cardinals  29–24
| style="| Cardinals  23–13
| 49ers  19–16
| Cardinals lose Super Bowl XLIII.
|-
| 
| style="| 
| style="| 49ers  20–16
| style="| 49ers  24–9
| 49ers  21–16
|
|-

|-
| 
| style="| 
| style="| 49ers  27–6
| style="| 49ers  38–7
| 49ers  23–16
|
|-
| 
| Tie 1–1
| style="| Cardinals  21–19
| style="| 49ers  23–7
| 49ers  24–17
|
|-
| 
| style="| 
| style="| 49ers  24–3
| style="| 49ers  27–13
| 49ers  26–17
| 49ers clinch NFC West division title with win at home. 49ers lose Super Bowl XLVII.
|-
| 
| style="| 
| style="| 49ers  23–20
| style="| 49ers  32–20
| 49ers  28–17
|
|-
| 
| Tie 1–1
| style="| Cardinals  23–14
| style="| 49ers  20–17
| 49ers  29–18
| 49ers open Levi's Stadium.
|-
| 
| style="| 
| style="| Cardinals  47–7
| style="| Cardinals  19–13
| 49ers  29–20
|
|-
| 
| style="| 
| style="| Cardinals  23–20
| style="| Cardinals  33–21
| 49ers  29–22
|
|-
| 
| style="| 
| style="| Cardinals  18–15 (OT)
| style="| Cardinals  20–10
| 49ers  29–24
|
|-
| 
| style="| 
| style="| Cardinals  18–15
| style="| Cardinals  28–18
| 49ers  29–26
| Cardinals win 8 straight meetings (2015–18).
|-
| 
| style="| 
| style="| 49ers  28–25
| style="| 49ers  36–26
| 49ers  31–26
| 49ers lose Super Bowl LIV.
|-

|-
| 
| Tie 1–1
| style="| 49ers  20–12
| style="| Cardinals  24–20
| 49ers  32–27
| No fans attended either game due to COVID-19 pandemic.
|-
| 
| style="| 
| style="| Cardinals  17–10
| style="| Cardinals  31–17
| 49ers  32–29
| 
|-
| 
| style="| 
| style="| 49ers  38–10
| style="| 49ers  38–13
| 49ers  34–29
| Cardinals home game played in Mexico City, at Estadio Azteca on Monday Night Football.
|-

|-
| Regular season
| style="|
| Tie 15–15
| 49ers 19–14
| 49ers won series in St. Louis 4–2. Teams are tied 1–1 in Mexico City, officially Cardinals home games.
|-

See also
 National Football League rivalries

References

Arizona Cardinals
San Francisco 49ers
National Football League rivalries
Arizona Cardinals rivalries
San Francisco 49ers rivalries
American football in St. Louis